Nigel Ian Callaghan (born 12 September 1962) is a former professional footballer.

Playing career
Callaghan played on the right-wing for a number of clubs including; Watford, Derby County and Aston Villa. Internationally, he represented England at Under-21 level and played one game for England B in November 1984 (alongside fellow Watford player Luther Blissett). Callaghan came on as a half time substitute to take part in a 2–0 win against a full New Zealand side.

Whilst at Watford, he played in the 1984 FA Cup Final where they lost to Everton. He had broken into their first team during the 1980–81 season and helped them win promotion to the First Division a year later. He also helped them finish second in the league in 1983. In total, he played 223 league games for the Hornets and scored 41 goals, before being transferred to Derby County in February 1987.

He scored four goals in 18 Second Division games for the Rams in the 1986–87 season as they cruised to the division championship and a return to the First Division after seven years away.

Callaghan was ever present for Derby as they secured their top-flight status in 1987–88, and he began the 1988–89 season well as Derby emerged as surprise title challengers (though they eventually had to settle for a fifth-place finish). He scored twice in 18 league games before moving to Aston Villa in February 1989 and making 16 league appearances for them (scoring once) as they secured their First Division survival a year after promotion. He played just eight games for Villa the following season, however, as they finished second and were beaten to the league title by Liverpool.

He played just twice in the 1990–91 season and was loaned back to Derby County. He also had loan spells with Huddersfield Town and Watford before new manager Ron Atkinson finally gave him a free transfer at the end of the 1991–92. Aged still only 29, his professional career was over, although he did continue playing for a while at non league level with Stafford Rangers.

Retirement
Callaghan retired from football to work as a DJ. While working in a Greek island (Corfu) night-club during the early-1990s he was featured on a television documentary. He currently lives in Stafford.

Illness
In November 2009 Callaghan was diagnosed with bowel cancer. An operation to remove the main tumour was undertaken in January 2010, however, some traces of cancer had moved elsewhere into his body and he subsequently faced a course of chemotherapy, which started in late March 2010. 
In September 2010 it was announced that a benefit match between former stars of two of Callaghan's old teams Derby County F.C. and Watford F.C. would take place at Pride Park Stadium during the close season.

Career statistics

References

External links
 
 

1962 births
Living people
English footballers
England under-21 international footballers
England B international footballers
Association football midfielders
Watford F.C. players
Aston Villa F.C. players
Derby County F.C. players
Huddersfield Town A.F.C. players
Stafford Rangers F.C. players
Hellenic F.C. players
English Football League players
English expatriates in Singapore
English expatriate footballers
FA Cup Final players